Judith Sargentini (born 13 March 1974) is a former Dutch politician and Member of the European Parliament (MEP). She is a member of the GreenLeft party, which is part of The Greens–European Free Alliance, and the European Green Party. Previously, she was chair of the party's delegation in Amsterdam's city council.

Biography
Of distant Italian descent from Bozzano, Province of Lucca, Tuscany, on her paternal side, Sargentini describes her family as being "politically very aware". As a child, her parents took her to demonstrations against the placement of nuclear weapons in the Netherlands. Between 1986 and 1992, she attended high school at the Spinozalyceum in Amsterdam. In 1999 she received an MA of history at the University of Amsterdam (specialising in totalitarian systems and the democratisation of Europe). Since 1990, Sargentini was politically active, first in the PSJG, the political youth organization of the left-socialist Pacifist Socialist Party, and later in DWARS, the political youth organization of the GreenLeft, a new political party in which the PSP had merged. During her study, she was also active in the international student movement. Sargentini is a vegetarian.

Political career 
She was secretary of the Dutch Student Union (between 1995 and 1996) and board member of the European Students' Union (in 1998).

In 2002, Sargentini was elected into the Amsterdam municipal council. Between 1999 and 2002, she sat as a co-opted assistant on the municipal council. Between 2006 and 2009, Sargentini served as chair of the GreenLeft party in the Amsterdam municipality. She was spokesperson on work & income, youth policy, and public order.

In addition to her membership of the council, Sargentini worked for various NGOs in the sphere development cooperation. Between 2000 and 2001, she was international coordinator of the European Network for Information and Action in Southern Africa. Following upon that, she worked as international-campaign coordinator for Fatal Transactions, a foundation that highlighted issues surrounding the international trade in conflict diamonds and the financing of (civil) wars in Africa. Between 2003 and 2007, she worked as lobbyist at the Dutch Institute for South Africa. Since 2007, she worked as consultant for the European alliance of development-cooperation organisations Eurostep.

Member of the European Parliament, 2009–2019
In 2009, Sargentini was one of the candidates for the position of party-foreperson on the list of the GreenLeft for the 2009 European Parliament elections. While a candidate for the position of GreenLeft party-foreperson in the EuroParl elections-campaign, Sargentini emphasized issues such as development-cooperation, migration, climate change, and emancipation. On 8 February 2009, it was announced that she was elected as lead candidate and party-foreperson for GreenLeft in the Netherlands European-Parliament elections. After five rounds of vote counting, she was elected with 52.4% of the tally. In 2009, she urged the international community to start negotiations with the Palestinian Hamas, and condemned Israel for its "disproportionate use of power". In 2015, she visited Israel and Palestine, and characterised Israel with the word Apartheid. In 2018 she accused Israel of war crimes for forcibly deporting the Palestinians. In 2015 she said that claiming that ISIS-warriors are coming into Europe with the refugees is just hysteria. In a video  her efforts were praised by the Hamas. She herself and the political stance of her party was criticized by the Chief Rabbi of the Netherlands in a demonstration outside of the office of the Green Party in Utrecht.  Binyomin Jacobs claimed that Sargentini's opinion encouraged antisemitism.

Sargentini became a member of the Committee on Civil Liberties, Justice, and Home Affairs of the European parliament, and substitute for the Committee on Development.

In addition to her committee assignments, Sargentini is a member of the European Parliament Intergroup on LGBT Rights. She is also a vice-chairwoman of the cross-party working groups on fair trade (sponsored by Fair Trade Advocacy), as well as on innovation, access to medicines, and poverty-related diseases (sponsored by Médecins Sans Frontières).

In the European parliament, Sargentini serves as rapporteur on conflict minerals. In 2014, she and Arturs Krišjānis Kariņš persuaded their fellow MEPs to back new rules under which public registers are created listing the beneficial owners of all EU companies and trusts.

From 2014 until 2019, Sargentini was a member of the Democracy Support and Election Coordination Group (DEG), which oversees the Parliament's election observation missions. She has led EU-Election Observer Missions on numerous occasions, including for the 2014 Tunisian parliamentary elections and the 2015 Tanzanian general elections.

Report on use of Article 7 against Hungary
In 2017, she was appointed by the European Parliament Committee on Civil Liberties, Justice and Home Affairs as the rapporteur to examine triggering Article 7 proceedings against Hungary alleging breaches of "core EU values". On 12 September 2018 the European Parliament adopted a resolution based on her report to trigger Article 7. The report  includes concerns mainly regarding the constitutional and electoral system; the independence of the judiciary’, corruption; privacy and data protection; freedom of expression; academic independence; freedom of religion and association; the right to equal treatment; the rights of minorities, migrants, asylum seekers and refugees; and the abolition of economic and social rights, antisemitism, antisemitic acts and hate speech. In point 57 of her report she accused the Hungarian prime minister Viktor Orbán of delivering antisemitic hate speech. In point 67, she claimed that the conviction of Ahmed H-, a Syrian refugee, who got into conflict with Hungarian policemen at the southern border, raises "the issue of proper application of the laws against terrorism in Hungary, as well as the right to a fair trial". The report was approved by the European Parliament, with 448 votes in favour, 197 against and 48 abstention.

The Hungarian Government questioned the legitimacy of this vote, claiming that this kind of decision would have needed a 2/3 majority. The Orbán-cabinet also stated that the abstinence votes should not have been omitted during the voting process - ignoring that only votes cast, excluding abstentions, were counted on the advice of the Parliament's legal service. Hungary turned to the European Court of Justice for a final decision. The government also edited a 109 pages long answer, which claims that the report contains at least 39 factual errors or fallacies. Ms Sargentini replied to this answer at a press conference, stating that she went through it and found "no holes in [her] report since it is based on sources of intergovernmental bodies such as the UN, the Council of Europe, court cases from Strasbourg and Luxembourg, infringement procedures", adding that the report does not express her personal opinion but that of the European Commission. The dean of the Hungarian university ELTE claimed that contrarily to what Ms Sargentini said, the university had not been consulted during Ms Sargentini's investigation, and asked the removal of its name from the report many times- without response. Another Hungarian university, the University of Pécs also raised this concern. On this issue, Ms Sargentini answered that names were omitted on the interviewed academics' request, who feared of being outed as they would be labelled anti-government and pursued for their opinions. The leaders of the Hungarian Jewish community said that contrarily to what Sargentini stated, antisemitism is actually in decline in Hungary, which is a safer place for Jewry than many West-European countries, due to the government's actions and to the lack of muslim population. Chief Rabbi, Slomó Köves declared that the Sargentini Report is misleading and unfounded concerning Hungarian antisemitism.

Following her report, Sargentini  became the subject of a negative TV campaign financed by the Hungarian government. Deserted by many of his conservative allies, the membership of the Hungarian governing party Fidesz was partially suspended by the European People's Party on 20 March 2019.

Other activities
 Fair Trials International, Patron
 Resistance Museum, Member of the Board

References

External links

 Europaparliament: Judith Sargentini
 Judith Sargentini on parlement.com

1974 births
Living people
GroenLinks MEPs
MEPs for the Netherlands 2014–2019
MEPs for the Netherlands 2009–2014
21st-century women MEPs for the Netherlands
Municipal councillors of Amsterdam
Dutch people of Italian descent
People of Tuscan descent